A Man in His Prime (German: Ein Mann im schönsten Alter) is a 1964 West German drama film directed by Franz Peter Wirth and starring Karl Michael Vogler, Pascale Audret and Françoise Prévost.

The film's sets were designed by the art director Rolf Zehetbauer.

Cast
Karl Michael Vogler as Richard Mertens
Pascale Audret as Eva
Françoise Prévost as Lucy
Marisa Mell as Brigitte
Hellmut Lange as Ferrow
Hans Caninenberg as Alfred von Xanten
Sigfrit Steiner as Kriminalinspektor Scherbl
Rosemarie Fendel as Margot

References

External links

1964 drama films
German drama  films
West German films
Films directed by Franz Peter Wirth
1960s German films